Academy of Our Lady of Guam (AOLG) is an all-girls Catholic high school located at 233 Archbishop Felixberto C. Flores Street in Hagåtña, Guam, United States. AOLG, Guam's sole all-girls high school, has an average yearly enrollment of 400 students.

In 2004 it was awarded the highest medal of recognition from the Archdiocese of Agaña. The school is accredited by the Western Association of Schools and Colleges.

The school has several clubs and organizations: Student Council, National Honor Society, Model United Nations, Mock Trial, and National Forensics League.

History
Bishop Appolinaris William Baumgartner, OFM Cap. and Sister Inez Underwood, RSM established the Academy of Our Lady of Guam on September 8, 1949.

Leadership

Principals 
 Sr. Mary Inez Underwood, RSM (1949–1953)
 Sr. Mary Roberta Taitano, RSM (1953–?)
 Sr. Mary Mark Martinez, RSM (?–1965–1966)
 Sr. Evelyn Muna, RSM (1966–1967)
 Sr. Marie Pierre Martinez, RSM (1967–1968–?)
 Sr. Francis Jerome Cruz, RSM (?–1973–1974–?)
 Sr. Mary Helene Torres, RSM (?–1982–1984
 Sr. Mary Angela Perez, RSM (1984–1990)
 Sr. Francis Jerome Cruz, RSM (1990–2004)
 Mary A. Terlaje Meeks '69 (2004–2020)
Iris Gaza '00 (2020–Present)

Presidents 
 Sr. Francis Jerome Cruz, RSM (2004–2015)
Sr. Angela Perez, RSM (2015–Present)

Notable alumni 
 Joann G. Camacho - Businesswoman and former First Lady of Guam.
 Yuri Kim - Korean-born American diplomat.
 Lourdes Leon Guerrero, current Governor of Guam
 Sabina Perez, educator and politician.
 Antoinette D. Sanford, businesswoman and politician.
 Therese M. Terlaje, politician
 Tammy Flores Garman Schoenen - First female postmaster of Guam.
 Mary Camacho Torres, politician 
 Chantelle Wong, current U.S. Director of the Asian Development Bank
 Michelle Ye Hee Lee, journalist

References

External links
 Academy of Our Lady of Guam
 COMMEMORATING THE 60TH ANNIVERSARY OF THE ACADEMY OF OUR LADY OF GUAM at govinfo.gov

Catholic secondary schools in Guam
Educational institutions established in 1949
Girls' schools in the United States
1949 establishments in Guam
Education in Hagåtña, Guam